Russell Jones was a member of the Arizona House of Representatives, representing Arizona's 24th District twice, the first time from January 2005 until January 2007, and the second time for two terms from January 2009 to January 2013. After his first term, Jones chose not to run in the 2006 election, and was replaced by Theresa Ulmer In the following election in 2008, Jones re-entered the race, and defeated Ulmer in the general election.

Prior to serving in the legislature, Jones served in the 82nd Airborne from 1970 to 1972, and currently serves as a pilot with the rank of major in the 508th Squadron of the Civil Air Patrol.

References

Republican Party members of the Arizona House of Representatives
1948 births
Living people